Bucculatrix crateracma is a moth in the family Bucculatricidae. It was described by Edward Meyrick in 1918 and is found in India.

The larvae feed on Bombax ceiba.

References

Natural History Museum Lepidoptera generic names catalog

Bucculatricidae
Moths described in 1918
Taxa named by Edward Meyrick
Moths of Asia